Mihelja Vas is a settlement north of the town of Črnomelj in the White Carniola area of southeastern Slovenia. The area is part of the traditional region of Lower Carniola and is now included in the Southeast Slovenia Statistical Region.

An archaeological field survey in 2000 and 2001 revealed the existence of a prehistoric as well as Roman settlement in the area.

References

External links
Mihelja Vas on Geopedia

Populated places in the Municipality of Črnomelj